Enio Zilić (born 12 July 2000) is a Bosnian professional footballer who plays as a centre-back for First League of FBiH club Rudar Kakanj.

References

External links
Enio Zilić at Sofascore

2000 births
Living people
Sportspeople from Zenica
Association football central defenders
Bosnia and Herzegovina footballers
FK Željezničar Sarajevo players
NK Čelik Zenica players
FK Rudar Kakanj players
Premier League of Bosnia and Herzegovina players
First League of the Federation of Bosnia and Herzegovina players